The 95th Military Police Battalion was the largest, most geographically dispersed Military Police battalion in the United States Army. It was last located in Sembach, Germany, the unit fell under the command of the 18th Military Police Brigade.

Subordinate units were
  HHD 95th Military Police Battalion, Rough Riders – Sembach
 64th Military Police Detachment/Company, Guardians of the World – Bremerhaven
  92nd Military Police Company, Rock Solid – Baumholder
 23rd MP Platoon, Savages
  230th Military Police Company, Warmasters – Sembach
 148th MP Platoon, Wiesbaden
  529th Military Police Company, Honor Guard – Heidelberg
 554th Military Police Company, War Dawgs – Stuttgart
 272nd Military Police Company, Fighting Deuce – Mannheim
 560th Military Police Company, Road Runners – Mannheim
 570th Military Police Company, Railway Guard – Mannheim
 59th Military Police Company – Pirmasens
 United States Army Corrections Facility-Europe, Mannheim
 66th Military Police Company,(FIGHTIN' DOUBLE SIX),Karlsruhe

Lineage
 Activated 8 July 1945 in Germany
 Inactivated 24 June 1946 in Germany
 Allotted 24 October 1950 to the Regular Army
 Activated 30 October 1950 in Korea
 Inactivated 15 August 1954 in Korea
 Activated 25 November 1965 at Fort Riley, Kansas
 Inactivated 13 April 1972 at Fort Lewis, Washington
 Activated 21 March 1973 in Germany
 Inactivated 10 June 2014 at Sembach, Germany

Unit honors

Campaign participation credit
Korean War:
 UN Offensive
 CCF Intervention
 First UN Offensive
 CCF Spring Offensive
 UN Summer–Fall Offensive
 Second Korean Winter
 Korea, Summer–Fall 1952
 Third Korean Winter
 Korea, Summer 1953

Vietnam War:
 Counteroffensive
 Counteroffensive, Phase II
 Counteroffensive, Phase III
 Tet Counteroffensive
 Counteroffensive, Phase IV
 Counteroffensive, Phase V
 Counteroffensive, Phase VI
 Tet 69/Counteroffensive
 Summer–Fall 1969
 Winter–Spring 1970
 Sanctuary Counteroffensive
 Counteroffensive, Phase VII
 Consolidation I
 Consolidation II
 Cease–Fire

War on Terrorism:
 Iraq (Operation Iraqi Freedom - OIF)
 Afghanistan (Operation Enduring Freedom - OEF)

Decorations

Heraldry

Motto
SUPERSTARS.

Distinctive unit insignia
The distinctive unit insignia was approved on 26 April 1966.

A gold colored metal and enamel device  in height overall consisting of a green four pointed star surmounted by two gold clamps in saltire.

Green and yellow are the colors used for the Military Police. The crossed clamps designating a restrictive or restraining force and the star for guidance symbolize the mission of the Military Police Battalion.

Coat of arms
The coat of arms was approved on 24 April 1974.

Shield
Vert, on a bend wavy Or between two griffins' heads couped of the last an oriental sword Sable.

Green and yellow (gold) are the colors used for the Military Police Corps. The griffin is a mythological creature famed for the attributes of vigilance, courage and strength and alludes to the unit. The color black suggests the robes of justices and the sword denotes leadership and military. The griffin heads, wavy bend and oriental sword together refer to the unit's three activations overseas: two in Europe and one in Asia.

Crest
On a wreath of the colors Or and Vert a rocky mound of the last and thereon a bamboo portcullis (gate) of three perpendicular bars Proper spiked Gules.

The bamboo portcullis alludes to Asia and the red spikes represent the Meritorious Unit Citations, one for Korea and two for Vietnam. The rocky mound and portcullis symbolize the adverse terrain, guerrilla attacks and transient camps during the unit's mission in Korea. The portcullis and spikes also refer to security at Long Binh Ammunition Depot and establishment of law and order for Long Binh Post during the Vietnam War.

HHD, 95th MP Bn

The Headquarters and Headquarters Detachment for the 95th Military Police Battalion are the Rough Riders. The Detachment was colocated with the HHC 18th Military Police Brigade on Sembach Kaserne at time of inactivation 10 Jun 2014.

References

095
Military units and formations established in 1945
Military units and formations disestablished in 2014